The Athletics at the 2016 Summer Paralympics – Men's 100 metres T53 event at the 2016 Paralympic Games took place on 9–9 September 2016, at the Estádio Olímpico João Havelange.

Heats

Heat 1 
10:00 9 September 2016:

Heat 2 
10:07 9 September 2016:

Heat 3 
10:14 9 September 2016:

Final 
19:22 9 September 2016:

Notes

Athletics at the 2016 Summer Paralympics
2016 in men's athletics